Dorcadion globithorax is a species of beetle in the family Cerambycidae. It was described by Jakovlev in 1895. It is known from Kyrgyzstan and Kazakhstan.

See also 
 Dorcadion

References 

globithorax
Beetles described in 1895